Lisa Kreuzer (born 2 December 1945) is a German television and film actress with credits for appearances in over 120 films and television series.

Career 
Kreuzer co-starred with Dennis Hopper and Bruno Ganz in Wim Wenders's film The American Friend (1977), a German-French co-production. During the years that she and Wenders were married (1974 to 1978), she also appeared in his Road Movie trilogy: Alice in the Cities (1974), The Wrong Move (1975) and Kings of the Road (1976). She is also in Christopher Petit's Wenders-influenced Radio On (1979), which was shot in the UK and is predominantly in English. More recently, she is also known for her role as Claudia Tiedemann in Dark, the first German-language Netflix original series.

Kreuzer appeared in the German TV series Derrick from 1977 to 1990 on nearly a dozen occasions.

Filmography

Films 
Alice in the Cities (1974), as Lisa, Alice's mother.
The Wrong Move (1975), as Janine
Kampf um ein Kind (1975, TV film), as Maria Mandelstam
Auf Biegen oder Brechen (1975), as Monika
The American Friend (1977), as Marianne Zimmermann.
Radio On (1980), as Ingrid.
Birgitt Haas Must Be Killed (1981), as Birgitt Haas
The Wounded Man (1983), as Elisabeth
Cold Fever (1984), as Silvie
 (1984), as Gudrun / Margueritte
Among Wolves (1985), as Carla
Berlin-Jérusalem (1989), as Else Lasker-Schüler
Von Gewalt keine Rede (1991, TV film), as Erika Zielke
Never Sleep Again (1992), as Rita
 (1996, TV film), as Caroline
 (1999), as Maja's mother
Der Schandfleck (1999, TV film), as Aloisia
Nicht mit UN's (2000), as Babsi
Gone Underground (2001, short film)
Das sündige Mädchen (2001), as Mutter.
Der Freund von früher (2002), as Katharina.
Love Crash (2002)
Brush with Fate (2003, TV film), as old Magdalena
 (2008, TV film), as Angelika Ill
 (2009), as Mrs. Danner
Dreileben: Don't Follow Me Around (2011), as Jo's mother
The Fifth Estate (2013), as East Berlin Woman
The Grand Budapest Hotel (2014), as Grande Dame.

Television series 
 : Der Einarmige (1976, TV series episode), as Karin Schulke
 Derrick – Season 4, Episode 9: "Inkasso" (1977), as Lena
 Die Dämonen (1977, TV miniseries), as Marya Timofeevna Lebyadkina
 Derrick – Season 5, Episode 8: "Solo für Margarete" (1978), as Margarete Wenk
 Derrick – Season 6, Episode 4: "Ein unheimliches Haus" (1979), as Annie
 Derrick – Season 7, Episode 4: "Tödliche Sekunden" (1980), as Ina Dommberg
 Derrick – Season 7, Episode 13: "Eine Rechnung geht nicht auf" (1980), as Helene Moldau
 Exil (1981, TV miniseries), as Erna Redlich
 Derrick – Season 8, Episode 9: "Der Untermieter" (1981), as Gudrun Kaul
 Derrick – Season 10, Episode 5: "Die kleine Ahrens" (1983), as Vera
 Wagner (1983, TV miniseries), as Friederike Meyer
 Derrick – Season 12, Episode 3: "Raskos Kinder" (1985), as Evelyn Hausner
 Derrick – Season 12, Episode 7: "Ein unheimlicher Abgang" (1985), as Mrs. Meissner
  (1988), as Silvia Lorentz
 Tassilo (1991), as Mia von Mufflings
 Amico mio (1998), as Angela's Mother
 Ihr Auftrag, Pater Castell (2008–2009), as Franziska Blank
 Die Bergwacht (2009–2010), as Aunt Maria
 Dark (2017–2020, Netflix Original Series), as Claudia Tiedemann

References

External links 

 Lisa Kreuzer at allmovie.com
Short Biography 

1945 births
Best Actress German Film Award winners
German film actresses
German television actresses
Living people
People from Hof, Bavaria
20th-century German actresses
21st-century German actresses